
Kevin Brown may refer to:

Entertainment
 Kevin Brown (blues musician) (born 1950), English blues guitarist
 Kevin Brown (author) (born 1960), American journalist and translator
 Kevin Brown (poet) (born 1970), American poet and teacher
 Kevin Brown (actor) (born 1972), American actor and comedian 
 Agent K, a fictional character played by Tommy Lee Jones in the Men in Black films
 Kevin Brown (British saxophonist)

Sports
 Kevin Brown (Australian footballer) (1920–2009), Australian rules footballer
 Kevin Brown (rugby league, born 1933) (1933–2000), Australian rugby league player
 Kevin Brown (rugby league, born 1984), English rugby league footballer
 Kevin Brown (cricketer) (born 1941), Australian cricketer
 Kevin Brown (punter) (born 1963), American football punter
 Kevin Brown (defensive tackle) (born 1985), American football player
 Kevin Brown (right-handed pitcher) (born 1965), American baseball player
 Kevin Brown (left-handed pitcher) (born 1966), American baseball player
 Kevin Brown (catcher) (born 1973), American baseball player
 Kevin Brown (ice hockey) (born 1974), Canadian ice hockey player
 Kevin Brown (bandy) (born 1993), American bandy player in Sweden
 Kevin Brown (discus thrower) (born 1964), British-Jamaican athlete

Other
 Kevin Brown (historian) (born 1961), English historian of medicine, archivist, and curator
 Kevin S. Brown, bishop of the Episcopal Church in Delaware

See also 
 List of people with surname Brown